Aphyosemion bivittatum (twostripe lyretail, two-banded killi, red lyretail) is a species of freshwater fish belonging to the family Aplocheilidae. It is found in rivers in southeastern Nigeria and southwestern Cameroon.  It was originally described as Fundulus bivittatus by Swedish zoologist Einar Lönnberg in 1895.  The holotype was discovered near a waterfall in the Ndian River in Cameroon and currently is located in the Stockholm Museum.

Appearance

A. bivittatum has an elongated, brightly coloured body with two dark bands made up of red spots running along each side, with the colors varying between populations. Individual males are commonly found with golden-brown dorsal surfaces, bluish sides, and golden ventral surfaces. The caudal and dorsal fins are green with red spots and bright yellow tips. It has 10–13 spines in its dorsal fin and 12–15 in its anal fin.

Habitat

The species is found in small calcium rich steams in the coastal rainforests of southeastern Nigeria and southwestern Cameroon. They are  benthopelagic, meaning they float just above the riverbed.

References

External links

Freshwater fish of West Africa
Freshwater fish of Cameroon
bivittatum
Taxa named by Einar Lönnberg
Fish described in 1895